The California Valley Solar Ranch (CVSR) is a 250 megawatt (MWAC) photovoltaic power plant in the Carrizo Plain, northeast of California Valley. The project is owned by NRG Energy, and SunPower is the EPC contractor and technology provider.
It is utilizing high-efficiency, crystalline PV panels designed and manufactured by SunPower. The project includes up to 88,000 SunPower solar tracking devices to hold PV panels that track the sun across the sky.

Project overview
The project began construction in 2011, and began operation in 2012 with 22 MW completed. It was fully completed in October 2013. At the time it was completed, "the California Valley Solar Ranch will power about 100,000 homes and will be one of the largest photovoltaic (PV) solar power plants in the world".

It is utilizing high-efficiency, crystalline PV panels designed and manufactured by SunPower. The project includes up to 88,000 SunPower solar tracking devices to hold PV panels that track the sun across the sky. The project delivers approximately 550 gigawatt-hours (GW·h) annually of renewable energy and has a capacity of 250 MW. While the plant only has a capacity factor of 25%, its power is generated during the middle of the day, when demand for electricity — and price — is much higher than at night.

Power Purchase Agreement
On August 14, 2008, Pacific Gas and Electric announced an agreement to buy all the power from the power plant. A Conditional Use Permit application for the project was filed with the County of San Luis Obispo Planning and Building Department on January 14, 2009. On November 30, 2010, NRG Energy announced that it would buy CVSR from SunPower for "up to $450 million". In September 2011, the Department of Energy (DOE) offered NRG Solar a $1.237 billion loan from the federal government to cover most of the  construction cost. The total cost of the project is estimated to be $1.6 billion.

Environment
The Carrizo Plain is home to 13 species listed as endangered either by the state or federal government, including the San Joaquin kit fox, giant kangaroo rat, and the California condor. SunPower worked with the community to protect local wildlife habitat and migration patterns, and reduced the amount of traffic in the area during construction.  In 2012, it was reported that SunPower and First Solar had designed a plan to create a 19,000 acre reserve for the giant kangaroo rat, San Joaquin kit fox and golden eagle in order to address concerns about habitat destruction.

Electricity production

Incidents
A fire removed 84% of the generating capacity from service in 2019 when poles and cables were damaged by an "avian incident."

See also

DeSoto Next Generation Solar Energy Center
Montalto di Castro Photovoltaic Power Station
Panoche Valley Solar Farm

References

External links
California Valley Solar Ranch (official website) Retrieved 2012-10-30.

Solar power stations in California
Photovoltaic power stations in the United States
Companies based in San Luis Obispo County, California
2011 establishments in California
NRG Energy